Věra Řeháková or Mináríková (born 9 November 1964) is a former ice dancer who competed for Czechoslovakia. With Ivan Havránek, she placed ninth at the 1988 European Championships and 15th at the 1988 Winter Olympics.

Competitive highlights 
With Havránek:

References 

1964 births
Czechoslovak female ice dancers
Living people
Olympic figure skaters of Czechoslovakia
Figure skaters at the 1988 Winter Olympics